Chi V or Chi 5 is a residential locality in south-western Greater Noida, Uttar Pradesh, India. Bordered by Chi IV and Chi III to the east and Sector 150 A, Noida to the west, it is known to be one of the real estate hotspots of Greater Noida, alongside Omega II, Omega I, Phi I, Phi III, Phi IV, Phi II, Chi II, Chi I, Chi IV and Chi III. It is named after the Greek letter Chi.

References 

Geography of Uttar Pradesh